Swede Hanson may refer to:

Tom Swede Hanson (American football), National Football League player
Robert Swede Hanson (wrestler), professional wrestler
Leonard C. "Swede" Hanson, American football player for the Cornell Big Red.
Peter "Swede" Hanson, Canadian politician

See also
Andy Swede Hansen, Major League Baseball player